Ceara Conway (born 1977) is an independent Irish contemporary visual artist and vocalist from the Connemara Gaeltacht region in County Galway, in the west of Ireland.

Biography 
Conway has a BA in Glass and Architectural Glass from Edinburgh College of Art and studied Community & Public Arts Education at the National College of Art and Design and Glass & Photography at Alfred University, New York.

Work 
She has been commissioned by art organisations and public institutions such as CREATE, Galway European Capital of Culture, Saolta Arts & Galway University Hospitals, Galway Public Arts Office, Ormston House, Waterways Ireland, Difference Exchange (UK), King's College (UK) and Atlas Arts (UK).

Along with her commissioned work, she performs nationally and internationally for prolific events, festivals & visiting heads of state. She has performed with  musicians such as Nick Roth, Caoimhin O Raghallaigh, Noirin Ni Rian, Linda Buckley and LAU. She is currently working on an album with producer and musician Sean Mac Erlaine.

Selected works 

Making Visible, Funded by CREATE and supported by the Arts Council, 2015
Say Goodbye, Commissioned by Verbal Arts Centre, Ulster Museum and curated by Declan Sheehan, 2016
Public art installation - Five Continents One People, Creagh Primary School, Galway, 2010
 Public art installation - 15 miles, St Brendan’s Nursing Home in Loughrea, County Galway, 2013-2015
 Live performance response to The Amulet, LAB Gallery, 2015.
 Performance - Iascealaíocht, Connemara, Curated by Gregory McCartney, 2018.
 Vicissitudes, Exile Ritual and Lament and A Vessel for Souls, Derry City of Culture and King's College London, 2013.

References

External links 
 Official site

Alumni of the Edinburgh College of Art
Irish artists
1977 births
Living people
Irish contemporary artists